Dundee (or  ) is Scotland's fourth-largest city and the 51st-most-populous built-up area in the United Kingdom. It lies within the eastern central Lowlands on the north bank of the Firth of Tay, which feeds into the North Sea. Under the name of Dundee City, it forms one of the 32 council areas used for local government in Scotland.

Within the boundaries of the historic county of Angus, the city developed into a burgh in the late 12th century and established itself as an important east coast trading port. Rapid expansion was brought on by the Industrial Revolution, particularly in the 19th century when Dundee was the centre of the global jute industry. This, along with its other major industries, gave Dundee its epithet as the city of "jute, jam and journalism".

Today, Dundee is promoted as "One City, Many Discoveries" in honour of Dundee's history of scientific activities and of the RRS Discovery, Robert Falcon Scott's Antarctic exploration vessel, which was built in Dundee and is now berthed at Discovery Point. Biomedical and technological industries have arrived since the 1980s, and the city now accounts for 10% of the United Kingdom's digital entertainment industry, including mobile app development and gaming. Dundee has two universities – the University of Dundee and Abertay University. In 2014, Dundee was recognised by the United Nations as the UK's first UNESCO City of Design for its diverse contributions to fields including medical research, comics and video games.

A unique feature of Dundee is that its two professional football clubs, Dundee F.C. and Dundee United F.C., have stadiums all but adjacent to each other.

With the decline of traditional industry, the city has adopted a plan to regenerate and reinvent itself as a cultural centre. In pursuit of this, a £1 billion master plan to regenerate and to reconnect the Waterfront to the city centre started in 2001 and is expected to be completed within a 30-year period. The V&A Dundee – the first branch of the V&A to operate outside of London – is the main centre piece of the waterfront project.

In recent years, Dundee's international profile has risen. GQ magazine named Dundee the "Coolest Little City in Britain" in 2015 and The Wall Street Journal ranked Dundee at number 5 on its "Worldwide Hot Destinations" list for 2018.

History 

The name "Dundee" is made up of two parts: the common Celtic place-name element dun, meaning fort; and a second part that may derive from a Celtic element, cognate with the Gaelic dè, meaning 'fire'.

While earlier evidence for human occupation is abundant, Dundee's success and growth as a seaport town arguably came as a result of William the Lion's charter, granting Dundee to his younger brother, David (later Earl of Huntingdon) in the late 12th century. The situation of the town and its promotion by Earl David as a trading centre led to a period of prosperity and growth. The earldom was passed down to David's descendants, amongst whom was John Balliol. The town became a Royal Burgh on John's coronation as king in 1292. The town and its castle were occupied by English forces for several years during the First War of Independence and recaptured by Robert the Bruce in early 1312. The original Burghal charters were lost during the occupation and subsequently renewed by Bruce in 1327.

The burgh suffered considerably during the conflict known as the Rough Wooing of 1543 to 1550, and was occupied by the English forces of Andrew Dudley from 1547. In 1548, unable to defend the town against an advancing Scottish force, Dudley ordered that the town be burnt to the ground. In 1645, during the Wars of the Three Kingdoms, Dundee was again besieged, this time by the Royalist Marquess of Montrose. The town was finally destroyed by Parliamentarian forces led by George Monck in 1651. The town played a pivotal role in the establishment of the Jacobite cause when John Graham of Claverhouse, 1st Viscount Dundee raised the Stuart standard on the Dundee Law in 1689. The town was held by the Jacobites in the 1715–16 rising, and on 6 January 1716 the Jacobite claimant to the throne, James VIII and III (the Old Pretender), made a public entry into the town. Many in Scotland, including many in Dundee, regarded him as the rightful king.

A notable resident of Dundee was Adam Duncan, 1st Viscount Duncan of Camperdown, Baron of Lundie (1 July 1731 to 4 August 1804). He was born in Dundee on 1 July 1731, the son of Alexander Duncan of Lundie, Provost of Dundee. Adam was educated in Dundee and later joined the Royal Navy on board the sloop Trial. He rose to be admiral and in October 1797 defeated the Dutch fleet off Camperdown (north of Haarlem). This was seen as one of the most significant actions in naval history.

The economy of mediaeval Dundee centred on the export of raw wool, with the production of finished textiles being a reaction to recession in the 15th century. Two government Acts in the mid 18th century had a profound effect on Dundee's industrial success: the textile industry was revolutionised by the introduction of large four-storey mills, stimulated in part by the 1742 Bounty Act which provided a government-funded subsidy on Osnaburg linen produced for export. Expansion of the whaling industry was triggered by the second Bounty Act, introduced in 1750 to increase Britain's maritime and naval skill base. Dundee, and Scotland more generally, saw rapid population increase at end of the 18th and beginning of the 19th century, with the city's population increasing from 12,400 in 1751 to 30,500 in 1821.

The phasing out of the linen export bounty between 1825 and 1832 stimulated demand for cheaper textiles, particularly for cheaper, tough fabrics. The discovery that the dry fibres of jute could be lubricated with whale oil (of which Dundee had a surfeit, following the opening of its gasworks) to allow it to be processed in mechanised mills resulted in the Dundee mills rapidly converting from linen to jute, which sold at a quarter of the price of flax. Interruption of Prussian flax imports during the Crimean War and of cotton during the American Civil War resulted in a period of inflated prosperity for Dundee and the jute industry dominated Dundee throughout the latter half of the 19th century. Unprecedented immigration, notably of Irish workers, led to accelerated urban expansion, and at the height of the industry's success, Dundee supported 62 jute mills, employing some 50,000 workers. Cox Brothers, who owned the massive Camperdown Works in Lochee, were one of the largest jute manufacturers in Europe and employed more than 5,000 workers.

The rise of the textile industries brought with it an expansion of supporting industries, notably of the whaling, maritime and shipbuilding industries, and extensive development of the waterfront area started in 1815 to cope with increased demand for port capacity. This ship is now on display at Discovery Point in the city. A significant whaling industry was also based in Dundee, largely existing to supply the jute mills with whale oil. Whaling ceased in 1912 and shipbuilding ceased in 1981.

While the city's economy was dominated by the jute industry, it also became known for smaller industries. Most notable among these were James Keiller's and Sons, established in 1795, which pioneered commercial marmalade production, and the publishing firm DC Thomson, which was founded in the city in 1905. Dundee was said to be built on the 'three Js': Jute, Jam and Journalism.

The town was also the location of one of the worst rail disasters in British history, the Tay Bridge disaster. The first Tay Rail Bridge was opened in 1878. It collapsed some 18 months later during a storm, as a passenger train passed over it, resulting in the loss of 75 lives. The most destructive fire in the city's history came in 1906, reportedly sending "rivers of burning whisky" through the street.

The jute industry fell into decline in the early 20th century, partly due to reduced demand for jute products and partly due to an inability to compete with the emerging industry in Calcutta. This gave rise to unemployment levels far in excess of the national average, peaking in the inter-war period, but major recovery was seen in the post-war period, thanks to the arrival first of American light engineering companies like Timex and NCR, and subsequent expansion into microelectronics.

A £1 billion master plan to regenerate Dundee Waterfront is expected to last for a 30-year period between 2001 and 2031. The aims of the project are to reconnect the city centre to the waterfront; to improve facilities for walking, cyclists and buses; to replace the existing inner ring road with a pair of east/west tree-lined boulevards; and to provide a new civic square and a regenerated railway station and arrival space at the western edge. A new Victoria and Albert Museum opened on 15 September 2018.

Governance 

Dundee was granted Royal Burgh status on the coronation of John Balliol as King of Scotland in 1292. The city has two mottos –  (Gift of God) and Prudentia et Candore (With Thought and Purity) a lthough usually only the latter is used for civic purposes.

Prior to 1996, Dundee was governed by the City of Dundee District Council. This was formed in 1975, implementing boundaries imposed in the Local Government (Scotland) Act 1973. Under these boundaries, the Angus burgh and district of Monifieth, and the Perth electoral division of Longforgan (which included Invergowrie) were annexed to the county of the city of Dundee. In 1996, the Dundee City unitary authority was created following implementation of the Local Government etc. (Scotland) Act 1994. This placed Monifieth and Invergowrie in the unitary authorities of Angus and Perth and Kinross, largely reinstating the pre-1975 county boundaries. Some controversy has ensued as a result of these boundary changes, with Dundee city councillors arguing for the return of Monifieth and Invergowrie.

Local government 

Dundee is one of 32 council areas of Scotland, and is represented by the Dundee City Council – a local council composed of 29 elected councillors. Previously the city was a county of a city and later a district of the Tayside region. Council meetings take place in the City Chambers, which opened in 1933 in City Square. The civic head and chair of the council is known as the Lord Provost, a position similar to that of mayor in other cities. The political head of the council is known as the Leader of the council or Leader of the Administration. The Leader chairs the Policy & Resources Committee. Dundee House, the new headquarters for the city council on North Lindsay Street, opened in August 2011. This has replaced Tayside House which was demolished in 2013 as part of the Dundee Waterfront improvements.

Elections to the council are normally on a four-year cycle. The most recent election took place on 5 May 2022. Since 2007, the Local Governance (Scotland) Act 2004 has meant that there are eight multi-member wards which elect three or four councillors by single transferable vote, to produce a form of proportional representation. The 2012 elections gave the SNP overall control of the council with 16 seats. However, the 2017 contest saw the SNP lose their majority, although they remained the largest party with 14 councillors. Scotland's longest-serving councillor, Ian Borthwick, sits on the council.

Westminster and Holyrood 
For elections to the British House of Commons at Westminster, the city area and portions of the Angus council area are divided in two constituencies. The constituencies of Dundee East and Dundee West are represented by Stewart Hosie (Scottish National Party) and Chris Law (Scottish National Party), respectively, both of whom were re-elected at the 2019 General Election. For elections to the Scottish Parliament at Holyrood, the city area is divided between three constituencies. The Dundee City East constituency and the Dundee City West constituency are entirely within the city area. The Angus South (Holyrood) constituency includes north-eastern and north-western portions of the city area. All three constituencies are within the North East Scotland electoral region: Shona Robison (SNP) is the Member of the Scottish Parliament (MSP) for the Dundee East constituency; Joe Fitzpatrick (SNP) is the current MSP for the Dundee West constituency and Graeme Dey (SNP) is the current MSP for the Angus South constituency.

Dundee was also part of the pan-Scotland European Parliament constituency until 31 January 2020 when the U.K. left the EU. Seven Members of the European Parliament (MEP)s were elected using the d'Hondt method of party-list proportional representation. In the last European Election Scotland voted, it returned three SNP MEPs, one Liberal Democrat MEP, one Conservative and Unionist MEP and one Brexit Party MEP, to the European Parliament.

Winston Churchill served as one of two MPs for Dundee from 1908 to 1922.

2014 Scottish independence referendum 
On 18 September 2014, Dundee was one of four council areas to vote "Yes" in the Scottish independence referendum, with 57.3% voting "Yes" on a 78.8% turnout. With the highest Yes vote for any local authority in Scotland, some in the Yes Scotland campaign nicknamed Dundee the 'Yes City', including former First Minister Alex Salmond.

Geography 

Dundee sits on the north bank of the Firth of Tay on the eastern, North Sea Coast of Scotland. The city lies  NNE of Edinburgh and  NNW of London. The town is bisected by a line of hills stretching from Balgay Hill (elevation of 143 m) in the west end of the city, through the Dundee Law (174 m) which occupies the centre of the built up area, to Gallow Hill (83 m), between Baxter Park and the Eastern Cemetery. North of this ridge lies a valley through which cuts the Dighty Water burn, the elevation falling to around 45 m. North of the Dighty valley lie the Sidlaw Hills, the most prominent hill being Craigowl Hill (455 m).

The western and eastern boundaries of the city are marked by two burns that are tributaries of the River Tay. On the westernmost boundary of the city, the Lochee burn meets the Fowlis burn, forming the Invergowrie burn, which meets the Tay at Invergowrie basin. The Dighty Water enters Dundee from the village of Strathmartine and marks the boundaries of a number of northern districts of the city, joining the Tay between Barnhill and Monifieth. The Scouring burn in the west end of the city and Dens Burn in the east, both of which played important roles in the industrial development of the city, have now been culverted over.

Geology 
The city lies within the Sidlaw-Ochil anticline, and the predominant bedrock type is Old Red Sandstone of the Arbuthnott-Garvock group. Differential weathering of a series of igneous intrusions has yielded a number of prominent hills in the landscape, most notably the Dundee Law (a late Silurian/early Devonian Mafic rock intrusion) and Balgay hill (a Felsic rock intrusion of similar age). In the east of the city, in Craigie and Broughty Ferry, the bedrock geology is of extrusive rocks, including mafic lava and tuff.

The land surrounding Dundee, particularly that in the lower lying areas to the west and east of the city, bears high quality soil that is particularly suitable for arable farming. It is predominantly of a brown forest soil type with some gleying, the lower parts being formed from raised beach sands and gravels derived from Old Red Sandstone and lavas.

Location

Urban environment 

Very little of pre-Reformation Dundee remains, the destruction suffered in the War of the Rough Wooing being almost total, with only scattered, roofless shells remaining. The area occupied by the medieval burgh of Dundee extends between East Port and West Port, which formerly held the gates to the walled city. The shoreline has been altered considerably since the early 19th century through development of the harbour area and land reclamation. Several areas on the periphery of the burgh saw industrial development with the building of textile mills from the end of the 18th century. Their placement was dictated by the need for a water supply for the modern steam powered machinery, and areas around the Lochee Burn (Lochee), Scouring Burn (Blackness) and Dens Burn (Dens Road area) saw particular concentrations of mills. The post war period saw expansion of industry to estates along the Kingsway.

Working-class housing spread rapidly and without control throughout the Victorian era, particularly in the Hawkhill, Blackness Road, Dens Road and Hilltown areas. Despite the comparative wealth of Victorian Dundee as a whole, living standards for the working classes were very poor. A general lack of town planning coupled with the influx of labour during the expansion of the jute industry resulted in insanitary, squalid and cramped housing for much of the population. While gradual improvements and slum clearance began in the late 19th century, the building of the groundbreaking Logie housing estate marked the beginning of Dundee's expansion through the building of planned housing estates, under the vision of city architect James Thomson, whose legacy also includes the housing estate of Craigiebank and the beginnings of an improved transport infrastructure by planning the Kingsway bypass.

Modernisation of the city centre continued in the post-war period. The medieval Overgate was demolished in the early 1960s to make way for a shopping centre, followed by construction of the inner ring road and the Wellgate Shopping Centre. The Tay Road Bridge, completed in 1966, had as its northern landfall the docklands of central Dundee, and the new associated road system resulted in the city centre being cut off from the river. An acute shortage of housing in the late 1940s was addressed by a series of large housing estates built in the northern environs, including the Fintry, Craigie, Charleston and Douglas areas in the 1950s and early 1960s. These were followed by increasingly cost-effective and sometimes poorly planned housing throughout the 1960s. Much of this, in particular the high-rise blocks of flats at Lochee, Kirkton, Trottick, Whitfield, Ardler and Menzieshill, and the prefabricated Skarne housing blocks at Whitfield, has been demolished since the 1990s or is scheduled for future demolition.

Climate 

The climate, like the rest of lowland Scotland, is Oceanic (Köppen-Geiger classification Cfb). Mean temperature and rainfall are typical for the east coast of Scotland, and with the city's sheltered estuarine position, mean daily maxima are slightly higher than coastal areas to the North, particularly in spring and summer. The summers are still chilly when compared with similar latitudes in continental Europe, something compensated for by the mild winters, similar to the rest of the British Isles.

On average, 4.73 days should record a minimum temperature at or below -5 °C and there are 53.26 days of air frost on average. From 1991 to 2020, Mylnefield averaged 0.9 ice days, 50 days with precipitation of more than 5mm and 19.56 days with more than 10mm. The weather station is in plant hardiness zone 10a.

Demography 

Dundee's recorded population reached a peak of 182,204 at the 1971 census. According to the 2011 census, the City of Dundee had a population of 147,268. A more recent population estimate of the City of Dundee has been recorded at 149,680 in 2020. The demographic make-up of the population is much in line with the rest of Scotland. The age group from 30 to 44 forms the largest portion of the population (20%). The median age of males and females living in Dundee was 37 and 40 years, respectively, compared to 37 and 39 years for those in the whole of Scotland.

The place of birth of the town's residents was 94.16% United Kingdom (including 87.85% from Scotland), 0.42% Ireland, 1.33% from other European Union (EU) countries, and 3.09% from elsewhere in the world. The economic activity of residents aged 16–74 was 35.92% in full-time employment, 10.42% in part-time employment, 4.25% self-employed, 5.18% unemployed, 7.82% students with jobs, 4.73% students without jobs, 15.15% retired, 4.54% looking after home or family, 7.92% permanently sick or disabled, and 4.00% economically inactive for other reasons. Compared with the average demography of Scotland, Dundee has both low proportions of people born outside the United Kingdom and for people over 75 years old.

Natives of Dundee are called Dundonians and are often recognisable by their distinctive dialect of Scots as well as their accent, which most noticeably substitutes the monophthong /ɛ/ (pronounced "eh") in place of the diphthong /aj/ (pronounced "ai"). Dundee, and Scotland more generally, saw rapid population increase at end of the 18th and beginning of the 19th century, with the city's population increasing from 12,400 in 1751 to 30,500 in 1821. Of particular significance was an influx of Irish workers in the early to mid-19th century, attracted by the prospect of employment in the textiles industries. In 1851, 18.9% of people living in Dundee were of Irish birth.

The city has also attracted immigrants from Italy, fleeing poverty and famine, in the 19th century Jews, fleeing from the Russia controlled portions of partitioned Poland and from German occupation in the 20th. Today, Dundee has a sizeable ethnic minority population, and has around 4,000 Asian residents which is the fourth-largest Asian community in Scotland. The city also has 1.0% of residents from a Black/African/Caribbean background.

Dundee has a higher proportion of university students – one in seven of the population – than any other town in Europe, except Heidelberg. The 14.2% come from all around the world to attend the local universities and colleges. Dundee is a major attraction for Northern Irish students who make up 5% of the total student population. The city's universities are believed to hold the highest percentage of Northern Irish students outside of Northern Ireland and have a big impact on the local economy and culture. However, this has declined in recent years due to the increase of tuition fees for students elsewhere in the UK. Dundee also has a lot of students from abroad, mostly from the Ireland and other EU countries but with an increasing number from countries from the Far East and Nigeria.

Ethnicity

Economy 

In 1911 40% of the city were employed in the jute industry. By 1951 this had dropped to 20%, and now is effectively zero.

The period following World War II was notable for the transformation of the city's economy. While jute still employed one-fifth of the working population, new industries were attracted and encouraged. NCR Corporation selected Dundee as the base of operations for the UK in late 1945, primarily because of the lack of damage the city had sustained in the war, good transport links and high productivity from long hours of sunshine. Production started in the year before the official opening of the plant on 11 June 1947. A fortnight after the tenth anniversary of the plant the 250,000th cash register was produced.

By the 1960s, NCR had become the principal employer of the city producing cash registers, and later ATMs, at several of its Dundee plants. The firm developed magnetic-strip readers for cash registers and produced early computers. Astral, a Dundee-based firm that manufactured and sold refrigerators and spin dryers was merged into Morphy Richards and rapidly expanded to employ over 1,000 people. The development in Dundee of a Michelin tyre-production facility helped to absorb the unemployment caused by the decline of the jute industry, particularly with the abolition of the jute control by the Board of Trade on 30 April 1969.

Employment in Dundee changed dramatically during the 1980s with the loss of nearly 10,000 manufacturing jobs due to closure of the shipyards, cessation of carpet manufacturing and the disappearance of the jute trade. To combat growing unemployment and declining economic conditions, Dundee was declared an Enterprise Zone in January 1984. In 1983, the first ZX Spectrum home computers were produced in Dundee by Timex. In the same year the company broke production records, despite a sit-in by workers protesting against job cuts and plans to demolish one of the factory buildings to make way for a supermarket. Timex closed its Dundee plant in 1993 following an acrimonious six-month industrial dispute. The Michelin Tyre factory closed in June 2020, with the loss of 850 jobs.

Modern day 

Dundee is a regional employment and education centre, with around 325,000 people within 30 minutes' drive of the city centre and 860,000 people within one hour. Many people from North East Fife, Angus and Perth and Kinross commute to the city. As of 2015, there were 395 employers who employed 250 or more staff; over a five-year period (2011–2015) the number of registered enterprises in Dundee increased by 20.9% from 2,655 to 3,210. The largest employers in the city are NHS Tayside, Dundee City Council, University of Dundee, Tayside Contracts, Tesco, D. C. Thomson & Co and BT.

Other employers include limited and private companies such as NCR, Michelin, Alliance Trust, Aviva, Royal Bank of Scotland, Asda, Stagecoach Strathtay, Tokheim, Scottish Citylink, Rochen Limited, C J Lang & Son (SPAR Scotland), Joinery and Timber Creations, Xplore Dundee, and W. L. Gore and Associates. Between 2009 and 2014 the hardest-hit sectors, in terms of jobs, were Information and Communication, Construction and Manufacturing which each lost around 500 full-time jobs. By contrast, the Professional, Scientific and Technical sector saw an upsurge in jobs in addition to the Business Administration and Support Service sector which increased by approximately 1,000 full-time and 300 part-time jobs in the same six-year period. Gross median weekly earnings of full-time employees in Dundee in 2015 was £523.50; men received £563.40 and women £451.80. Gross weekly pay for all employees in Dundee has increased from £325.00 in 2000 to £380.00 in 2015.

The biomedical and biotechnology sectors, including start-up biomedical companies arising from university research, employ just under 1,000 people directly and nearly 2,000 indirectly. Information technology and video game development have been important industries in the city for more than 20 years. Rockstar North, developer of Lemmings and the Grand Theft Auto series was founded in Dundee as DMA Design by David Jones; an undergraduate of the Abertay University. Rockstar Games returned to Dundee in 2020 when they acquired Ruffian Games to form Rockstar Dundee. Other game development studios in Dundee include Denki, Dynamo Games, 4J Studios and Outplay Entertainment, among others.

Dundee is also a key retail destination for North East Scotland and has been ranked fourth in Retail Rankings in Scotland. The city centre offers a wide variety of retailers, department stores and independent/specialist stores. The Murraygate and High Street forms the main pedestrian area and is home to a number of main anchors such as Marks and Spencer, Accessorise and Zara. The main pedestrian area also connects the two large shopping centres; the  Overgate Centre which is anchored by Primark, H&M, Next, Argos, and The Perfume Shop and the  Wellgate Centre by Home Bargains, T. J. Hughes, B&M, Superdrug, Iceland, Holland & Barrett, Poundland, Savers, The Works, Hydro Electric, Other retail areas in the city include Gallagher Retail Park, Kingsway East Retail Park and Kingsway West Retail Park.

Landmarks 

The city and its landscape are dominated by The Law and the Firth of Tay. The Law, a large hill to the north of the City Centre was the site of an Iron Age Hill Fort, upon which the Law War Memorial, designed by Thomas Braddock, was erected in 1921 to commemorate the fallen of World War I. The waterfront, much altered by reclamation in the 19th century, retains several of the docks that once were the hub of the jute and whaling industries, including the Camperdown and Victoria Docks. The Victoria Dock is the home of the frigate HMS Unicorn and the North Carr Lightship, while Captain Scott's RRS Discovery occupies Craig Pier, from where the ferries to Fife once sailed.

The oldest building in the city is St Mary's Tower, which dates from the late 15th century. This forms part of the City Churches, which consist of St Clement's Church, dating to 1787–8 and built by Samuel Bell, Old St Paul's and St David's Church, built in 1841–42 by William Burn, and St Mary's Church, rebuilt in 1843–44, also by Burn, following a fire. Other significant churches in the city include the Gothic Revival St Paul's Episcopal Cathedral, built by Sir George Gilbert Scott in 1853 on the former site of Dundee Castle in the High Street, and the Catholic St. Andrew's Cathedral, built in 1835 by George Mathewson in Nethergate.

As a result of the destruction suffered during the Rough Wooing, little of the mediaeval city (aside from St Mary's Tower) remains and the earliest surviving domestic structures date from the Early Modern Era. A notable example is the Wishart Arch (or East Port) in Cowgate. It is the last surviving portion of the city walls. Dating from prior to 1548, it owes its continued existence to its association with the Protestant martyr George Wishart, who is said to have preached to plague victims from the East Port in 1544. Another is the building complex on the High Street known as Gardyne's Land, parts of which date from around 1560. The Howff burial ground in the northern part of the City Centre also dates from this time; it was given to the city by Mary Queen of Scots in 1564, having previously served as the grounds of a Franciscan abbey.

Several castles can be found in Dundee, mostly from the Early Modern Era. The earliest parts of Mains Castle in Caird Park were built by David Graham in 1562 on the site of a hunting lodge of 1460. Dudhope Castle, originally the seat of the Scrymgeour family, dates to the late 16th century and was built on the site of a keep of 1460. Claypotts Castle, a striking Z plan castle in West Ferry, was built by John Strachan and dates from 1569 to 1588. In 1495 Broughty Castle was built and remained in use as a major defensive structure until 1932, playing a role in the Anglo-Scottish Wars and the Wars of the Three Kingdoms. The castle stands on a shallow tip projecting into the Firth, alongside two beaches, one of sand, the other of pebbles. The ruins of Powrie Castle, north of Fintry, date from the 16th-century castle north.

North of the City Churches, at the end of Reform Street, lies the High School of Dundee, built in 1829–34 by George Angus in a Greek Revival style. Another school building of note is Morgan Academy on Forfar Road, built in 1863, designed by John Dick Peddie in a Dutch Gothic style.

Dundee's industrial history as a centre for textile production is apparent throughout the city. Numerous former jute mills remain standing and while some lay derelict, many have been converted for other uses. Of particular note are the Tay Works, built by the Gilroy Brothers c.1850–1865, Camperdown Works in Lochee, which built and owned by Cox Brothers, one of Europe's largest jute manufacturing companies, and begun in 1849, and Upper Dens Mill and Lower Dens Works, built by the Baxter Brothers in the mid-19th century.

A more recent landmark is the  Tower Building of the University of Dundee built between 1959 and 1961. At the time of its construction only the Old Steeple was taller in the city. The Tower was built to replace the original college buildings which stood on the site. The building houses the university's main administration and includes galleries and the university's Archive, Records Management and Museum Services.

Many 1960s landmark multi-storey housing buildings were demolished in the late 2000s. The former Tayside House block, nicknamed 'Faulty Towers' by many local people, was demolished in 2013 as part of the waterfront redevelopment program. According to the architectural historian Charles McKean and his co-authors of Lost Dundee, the best views in the city were from Tayside House, because these were the only views from which the building itself could not be seen.

Transport

Road

Dundee is served by the A90 road, which connects the city to the M90 and Perth in the west with Forfar and Aberdeen in the north. The part of the road that is in the city is a dual carriageway and forms the city's main bypass on its north side, known as the Kingsway. East of the A90's Forfar Road junction, the Kingsway East continues as the A972 and meets the A92 at the Scott Fyffe roundabout. Travelling east, the A92 connects the city to Arbroath and Montrose and to the south with Fife, via the Tay Road Bridge.

The A930 links the city with coastal settlements to the east, including Monifieth and Carnoustie. Progressing westward from where the A92 meets the Tay Road Bridge at the Riverside Roundabout, the A85 follows the southern boundary of the city along Riverside Drive and towards the A90 at the Swallow Roundabout. The A85 multiplexes with the A90 and diverges again at Perth.

Also meeting the A92 and A85 at the Riverside Roundabout is the A991 Inner Ring Road, which surrounds the perimeter of the city centre, returning to the A92 on the east side of the Tay Road Bridge. The A923 Dundee to Dunkeld road meets the A991 at the Dudhope Roundabout, and the A929 links the A991 to the A90 via Forfar Road.

Buses

Dundee has an extensive network of bus routes. The Seagate bus station is the city's main terminus for journeys out of town. Xplore Dundee operates most of the intra-city services, with other more rural services operated by Stagecoach Strathtay. The city's two railway stations are the main Dundee station, near the waterfront, which has now finished re-construction as part of the waterfront re-development programme and the much smaller Broughty Ferry station at the eastern end of the city.

There are also many inter-city bus services offered by Megabus, Citylink and National Express.

Rail

Passenger services at Dundee are provided by ScotRail, CrossCountry, Caledonian Sleeper and London North Eastern Railway. There are other nearby stations at Invergowrie, Balmossie and Monifieth.

No freight trains have served the city since the Freightliner terminal in Dundee was closed in the 1980s.

Airport

Dundee Airport offers commercial flights to London City, Belfast City and Sumburgh (Shetland) by Scotland's Airline: Loganair.

The nearest major international airport is Edinburgh Airport,  to the south.

Seaport

The cargo port of Dundee is one of the largest economic generators in the city and is operated by Forth Ports. Seafarers arriving at the port are offered welfare and pastoral assistance by seafarers charity Apostleship of the Sea.

Education

Colleges and universities 

Dundee is home to two universities and a student population of approximately 20,000.

The University of Dundee became an independent entity in 1967, after 70 years of being incorporated into the University of St Andrews. It was founded in 1881 by Mary Ann Baxter and her distant cousin John Boyd Baxter as University College, Dundee, and teaching began in 1883. It fully merged with the University of St Andrews in 1897 and was reorganised as Queen's College, Dundee in 1954. Significant research in biomedical fields is carried out in the School of Life Sciences. The university is also home to Dundee Law School, situated in the Scrymgeour Building on the main campus and the School of Medicine, based at the city's Ninewells Hospital. The university also incorporates the Duncan of Jordanstone College of Art and Design and the teacher training college.

Abertay University was founded as Dundee Institute of Technology in 1888. Previously, the buildings formed Bell Street Technical College, a further education college. It was granted university status in 1994 under the Further and Higher Education Act, 1992. The university is noted for its computing and creative technology courses, particularly in the fields of computer games technology and cyber-security. Notable alumni include David Jones, founder of DMA Design (now known as Rockstar North), Sir Brian Souter, founder of Stagecoach, and Lord Iain McNicol, former General Secretary of the Labour Party.

Dundee College is the city's umbrella further education college, which was established in 1985 as an institution of higher education and vocational training. As of 2013, it merged with Angus College in Arbroath, to become Dundee and Angus College (D&A College).

The Al-Maktoum College of Higher Education was established in Dundee in Blackness Road in 2002. It is a research-led institution of higher education which are currently offering programmes accredited by SQA in the study of Islam and Muslims, Arabic language and Islamic Economics and Finance. It is an independent institution. It is named after its patron, Hamdan bin Rashid Al Maktoum.

Schools 

Schools in Dundee have a pupil enrolment of over 20,300. There are 37 primary state schools and 8 secondary state schools in the city. There are 11 primary and 2 secondary Roman Catholic denominational schools which, as in the rest of Scotland, are open to children of all denominations. The remainder are non-denominational. There is also one specialist school that caters for pupils with learning difficulties aged between five and 18 from Dundee and the surrounding area.

Dundee has one independent school, the High School of Dundee, which was founded in the 13th century by the Abbot and monks of Lindores Abbey. The current building was designed by George Angus in a Greek Revival style and built in 1832–34. Notable students in the early modern period included Thomas Thomson, Hector Boece, and the brothers James, John and Robert Wedderburn who were the authors of The Gude and Godlie Ballatis, used early in the Scottish Reformation as a vehicle to spread Protestant theology. According to Blind Harry's largely apocryphal work The Actes and Deidis of the Illustre and Vallyeant Campioun Schir William Wallace, William Wallace was also educated in Dundee.

Religious sites

Christian groups 

The Church of Scotland Presbytery of Dundee is responsible for overseeing the worship of 37 congregations in and around the Dundee area, although changing population patterns have led to some of the churches becoming linked charges. Due to their city centre location, the City Churches, Dundee Parish Church (St Mary's) and the Steeple Church, are the most prominent Church of Scotland buildings in Dundee. They are on the site of the medieval parish kirk of St Mary, of which only the 15th-century west tower survives. The attached church was once the largest parish church in medieval Scotland.

Dundee was unusual among Scottish medieval burghs in having two parish kirks; the second, dedicated to St Clement, has disappeared, but its site was approximately that of the present City Square. Other presbyterian groups include the Free Church which meet at St. Peters (the historic church of Robert Murray M'Cheyne) where prominent theologians David Robertson and Sinclair B. Ferguson regularly preach.

In the Middle Ages Dundee was also the site of houses of the Dominicans (Blackfriars), and Franciscans (Greyfriars), and had a number of hospitals and chapels. These establishments were sacked during the Scottish Reformation, in the mid-16th century, and were reduced to burial grounds, now Barrack Street (also referred to as the Dek-tarn street) and The Howff burial ground, respectively.

St. Paul's Cathedral is the seat of the Scottish Episcopal Diocese of Brechin. It is charged with overseeing the worship of 9 congregations in the city, as well as a further 17 in Angus, the Carse of Gowrie and parts of Aberdeenshire. Since 2018 the diocese has been led by Bishop Andrew Swift. St. Andrew's Cathedral is the seat of the Roman Catholic Diocese of Dunkeld, led by Bishop Stephen Robson. The diocese is responsible for overseeing 15 congregations in Dundee and 37 in the surrounding area, including St Mary, Our Lady of Victories Church in the city.

There are Methodist, Baptist, Congregationalist, Pentecostal and Salvation Army churches in the city, and non-mainstream Christian groups are also well represented, including the Unitarians, the Society of Friends, the Jehovah's Witnesses, Seventh-day Adventists, Christadelphians, and the Church of Jesus Christ of Latter-day Saints.

Other religious communities 
Muslims are served by the Dundee Central Mosque built in 2000 to replace their former premises on the Hilltown. There are three other mosques in the city including;
Jamia Masjid Tajdare Madina on Victoria Road, Jame Masjid Bilal on Dura Street and Al Maktoum Mosque on Wilkie's Lane. Alongside these there is an Islamic Society on the University of Dundee campus.

The Sikh community is served by the Guru Nanak Gurdwara on Victoria Road, which serves its community in Dundee.

A recorded Jewish community has existed in the city since the early 19th century. Dundee Buddhist Group is a Buddhist Temple based in Reform Street. There is also a Hindu mandir in Taylor's Lane situated in the West End of the city.

Culture 
Dundee made a bid to be named the 2017 UK City of Culture, and on 19 June 2013 was named as one of the four short-listed cities alongside Hull, Leicester and Swansea Bay. Ultimately, Dundee's bid was unsuccessful, with Hull winning the contest. Dundee came in fifth place in a newspaper survey regarding numbers of cultural venues in the United Kingdom, ahead of other Scottish cities.

In August 2021, Dundee made a joint bid with Perth and Kinross, Angus and Fife for the UK City of Culture again in 2025 under the title of 'Tay Cities'.

Dundee also went to bid to become the European Capital of Culture in 2023 but due to the United Kingdom voting to leave the European Union in June 2016, Dundee's bid, along with those of other British cities submitting bids, was discontinued by the European Commission.

Museums and galleries

The city's main museum and art gallery, McManus Galleries, is in Albert Square. The exhibits include work by James McIntosh Patrick, Alberto Morrocco and David McClure amongst the collection of fine and decorative art, items from Dundee's history and natural history artefacts.

Dundee Contemporary Arts (abbreviated DCA) opened in 1999 is an international art centre in the Nethergate close to Dundee Rep, which houses two contemporary art galleries, a two-screen arthouse cinema, a print studio, a visual research centre and a café bar.

Britain's only full-time public observatory, Mills Observatory at the summit of the city's Balgay Hill, was given to the city by linen manufacturer and keen amateur scientist John Mills in 1935.

Sensation Science Centre in the Greenmarket is a science centre based on the five senses with a series of interactive shows and exhibits. Verdant Works is a museum dedicated to the once dominant jute industry in Dundee and is based in a former jute mill.

The University of Dundee also runs several public museums and galleries, including the D'Arcy Thompson Zoology Museum and the Tayside Medical History Museum. The university, through Duncan of Jordanstone College of Art and Design also offers the Cooper Gallery for contemporary art, and its archives including: the abcD (artists' books collection Dundee); the REWIND Archive (video art collection); and the Richard Demarco Digital Archive.

The V&A Dundee Museum of Design opened in September 2018 and is built south of Craig Harbour onto the River Tay in a building designed by Kengo Kuma. It was officially opened by the Earl and Countess of Strathearn in 2019. It is the centrepiece of the city's waterfront redevelopment. The new museum may bring another 500,000 extra visitors to the city and create up to 900 jobs.

The city's archival records are mostly kept by two archives: Dundee City Archives, operated by Dundee City Council and the University of Dundee's Archive Services.
Dundee City Archives holds the official records of the city and of the former Tayside Regional Council. The archive also holds the records of various people, groups and organisations connected to the city. The university's Archive Services hold a wide range of material relating to the university and its predecessor institutions and to individuals associated with the university, such as D'Arcy Wentworth Thompson. Archive Services also holds the archives of several individuals, businesses and organisations based in Dundee and the surrounding area. The records held include a substantial number of business archives relating to the jute and linen industry in Dundee; records of other businesses including the archives of the Alliance Trust and the department store G. L. Wilson; the records of the Brechin Diocese of the Scottish Episcopal Church; and the NHS Tayside Archive. The same archive also holds the Michael Peto collection which includes thousands of the photojournalist's photographs, negatives, slides, publications and papers.

Literature
Dundee has a strong literary heritage, with several authors having been born, lived or studied in the city. These include A. L. Kennedy, Rosamunde Pilcher, Kate Atkinson, Thomas Dick, Mary Shelley, Mick McCluskey, John Burnside and Neil Forsyth. The Dundee International Book Prize is a biennial competition open to new authors, offering a prize of £10,000 and publication by Polygon Books. Past winners have included: Andrew Murray Scott, Claire-Marie Watson and Malcolm Archibald. William McGonagall, regularly cited as the "world's worst poet", worked and wrote in the city, often giving performances of his work in pubs and bars. Many of his poems are about the city and events therein, such as his work The Tay Bridge Disaster.

Dundee's poetic heritage is represented by the 2013 poetry anthology Whaleback City edited by W. N. Herbert and Andy Jackson (Dundee University Press) containing poems by McGonagall, Don Paterson, Douglas Dunn, John Burnside and many others. City of Recovery Press was founded in Dundee, and has become a controversial figure in documenting the darker side of the city.

Cinema 
The Dundee Mountain Film Festival (DMFF), held in the last weekend of November, presents the best presenters and films of the year in mountaineering, mountain culture and adventure sport, along with an art and trade exhibition. DMFF is also one of the members of International Alliance for Mountain Film (IAMF) among other important international mountain film festivals.

Dundee Contemporary Arts hosts an annual horror film festival called Dundead, which started in 2011.

The city also has two Multiplex cinemas, Odeon and Cineworld.

Music 
Dundee is home to a full-time repertory ensemble, which originated in 1939. One of its alumni, Hollywood actor Brian Cox, is a native of the city. The Dundee Repertory Theatre, built in 1982, is also the base for the Scottish Dance Theatre company.

Dundee's principal concert auditorium, the Caird Hall (named after its benefactor, the jute baron James Key Caird) in the City Square regularly hosts the Royal Scottish National Orchestra. Various smaller venues host local and international musicians during Dundee's annual Jazz, Guitar and Blues Festivals.

Dundee has hosted the National Mod a number of times – 1902, 1913, 1937, 1959 and 1974.

Dundee also hosted BBC Radio 1's Big Weekend back in 2006 and was due to host for a second time in 2020 but it was cancelled due to the COVID-19 pandemic. Due to this, there is speculation that the city will host the 2021 festival.

Popular music groups such as the 1970s soul-funk outfit Average White Band, the Associates, the band Spare Snare, Danny Wilson, The Hazey Janes, and the Indie rock bands The View and The Law are from Dundee. Musician, songwriter and performer Michael Marra was born and raised in Dundee. Ricky Ross of Deacon Blue and singer-songwriter KT Tunstall are former pupils of the High School of Dundee, although Tunstall is not a native of the city. The Northern Irish indie rock band Snow Patrol was formed by students at the University of Dundee. Brian Molko, lead singer of Placebo, grew up in the city as did Ian Cussick, singer of Lake. At the end of June, Dundee hosts an annual blues festival known as the Dundee Blues Bonanza.

Media 

Dundee is home to DC Thomson & Son Ltd, established in 1905, which produces over 200 million magazines, newspapers and comics every year; these include The Beano, The Dandy and The Press and Journal.

Dundee is home to one of eleven BBC Scotland broadcasting centres, located within the Nethergate Centre. STV North's Tayside news and advertising operations are based in the Seabraes area of the city, from where an STV News Tayside opt-out bulletin is broadcast, (though not on Digital Satellite), within the nightly regional news programme, STV News at Six. The city also had a community internet TV station called The Dundee Channel which was launched on 1 September 2009.

The city has three local radio stations. Radio Tay was launched on 17 October 1980. The station split frequencies in January 1995 launching Tay FM for a younger audience and Tay 2 playing classic hits. In 1999, Discovery 102 was launched, later to be renamed Wave 102 following a claim by The Discovery Channel that the station could mistakenly be linked to its brand.

Sport and recreation

Football 

Dundee has two professional football clubs: Dundee, founded in 1893, and Dundee United, founded in 1909 as Dundee Hibernian. Dundee FC currently plays in the Scottish Championship and Dundee United currently play in the Scottish Premiership. Their grounds Kilmac Stadium and Tannadice Park are just 100 metres apart, closer together than any other football stadiums in the UK. The Dundee derby is one of the most highly anticipated fixtures in Scottish football.

Dundee is one of four British cities to have produced two European Cup semi-finalists. Dundee lost to A.C. Milan in 1963 and Dundee United lost to A.S. Roma in 1984. Dundee also reached the semi-finals of the forerunner to the UEFA Cup in 1968 and Dundee United were runners-up in the UEFA Cup in 1987. There are also seven junior football teams in the area: Dundee North End, East Craigie, Lochee Harp, Lochee United, Dundee Violet, Broughty Athletic and Downfield.

Ice hockey 
Dundee Stars, the main ice hockey team, play at the Dundee Ice Arena. The team joined the Elite League in the 2010/2011 season. They are one of three professional ice hockey teams in Scotland, and play against teams from England, Wales and Northern Ireland in the Elite League. In the 2013/2014 season, Dundee Stars won the Gardiner Conference trophy, their only one to date. The majority of the players are from Canada and the United States. Omar Pacha is the current head coach and general manager of the Dundee Stars. There are also two amateur ice hockey teams, Dundee Tigers and Dundee Comets, who both play in the Scottish National League.

Rugby 
The city is also home to six rugby union teams. Dundee High School Former Pupils play in Scottish National League Division One, the second tier of Scottish club rugby. The remainder of the teams compete in the Caledonia Regional League – Harris Academy FP play in Caledonia Division One, Morgan Academy FP and Panmure in Caledonia Division Two Midlands, Dundee University Medics and Stobswell in Caledonia Division Three Midlands.

Other sports 
Local sports clubs include Dundee Handball Club, Grove Menzieshill Hockey Club; Dundee Wanderers Hockey Club, Dundee Volleyball Club, Dundee Northern Lights Floorball Club, Dundee Hawkhill Harriers, Dundee City Aquatics, Dundee Hurricanes and Dundee & Angus Radio Controlled Car Klub (DARCCK).

The Olympia Leisure Centre, opened in 2013, has a swimming pool.

There is a velodrome, Caird Park Velodrome.

Public services 

Dundee and the surrounding area is supplied with water by Scottish Water. Dundee, along with parts of Perthshire and Angus is supplied from Lintrathen and Backwater reservoirs in Glen Isla. Electricity distribution is by Scottish Hydro Electric plc, part of the Scottish and Southern Energy group.

Waste management is handled by Dundee City Council. There is a kerbside recycling scheme that currently only serves 15,500 households in Dundee. Cans, glass and plastic bottles are collected on a weekly basis. Compostable material and non-recyclable material are collected on alternate weeks. Paper is collected for recycling on a four-weekly basis.

Recycling centres and points are at a number of locations in Dundee. Items accepted include steel and aluminium cans, cardboard, paper, electrical equipment, engine oil, fridges and freezers, garden waste, gas bottles, glass, liquid food and drinks cartons, plastic bottles, plastic carrier bags, rubble, scrap metal, shoes and handbags, spectacles, textiles, tin foil, wood and yellow pages. Recent figures taken in 2008, suggest the city council has a recycling rate of 36.1%.

Law enforcement is provided by Police Scotland. The headquarters of the Dundee Branch of Police Scotland is situated in West Bell Street. There are also four police stations which serve the city: Maryfield, Lochee, Downfield and Longhaugh.

Healthcare is supplied in the area by NHS Tayside. Ninewells Hospital, is the only hospital with an accident and emergency department in the area. Dundee is also served by the East Central Region of the Scottish Ambulance Service which covers the city, Tayside and Kingdom of Fife. There is one ambulance station for the city; on West School Road.

The Scottish Fire and Rescue Service operate three fire stations, covering the city and surrounding villages. The main station is at Blackness Road and there is a control room at Macalpine Road fire station.

Sister cities 

Chronologically:
  Orléans, France (1946)
  Zadar, Croatia (1959)
  Alexandria, United States (1962)
  Würzburg, Germany (1962)
  Nablus, Palestine (1980)
  Dubai, United Arab Emirates (2004)
  West Dundee, United States (2013)

Freedom of the City
The following people and military units have received the Freedom of the City of Dundee.

Individuals
 Sir John Leng: 1902.
 Whitelaw Reid: 1906.
 Rt Hon H. H. Asquith : October 1912.
 Emma Grace Marryat: 1918.
 Rt Hon Thomas Johnston : 1947.
 HM Queen Elizabeth The Queen Mother: 1954.
 Maurice McManus: 1981.
 Nelson Mandela: 9 October 1993.
 Rt Hon Ramsay MacDonald 
 Rt Hon Stanley Baldwin 
 Rev. William Macmillan
 James McLean

Military units
 The Black Watch (Royal Highland Regiment): 1954.

See also 
 Brittle Bone Society, a UK charity established in 1968 in Dundee
 Dundee Museum of Transport
 History of Dundee#Notable Dundonians and people associated with Dundee
 Alexander C. Lamb and references to the Lamb Collection, which is held in the City Museum and the Local History Centre of Dundee Central Library

Notes

References

News

Websites

Maps

Listed building reports

Bibliography

External links 

 
 
 Dundee City Council
 National Library of Scotland: SCOTTISH SCREEN ARCHIVE (selection of archive films about Dundee)

 
Port cities and towns in Scotland
Port cities and towns of the North Sea
Lieutenancy areas of Scotland
Council areas of Scotland
Cities in Scotland
Civil parishes of Scotland
Populated places in Dundee